Sergei Alekseyevich Kalinin (born 23 December 1926) is a retired Soviet sports shooter. He competed at the 1960 and 1964 Olympics in the individual trap event and finished in 3rd and 22nd place, respectively.

Biography 
Kalinin was born to a hunter and started shooting aged seven. Between 1943 and 1945 he fought in World War II, and after that started training in sports shooting. He won two world titles with the Soviet team, in 1958 and 1962.

Awards 
 Medal "For Labour Valour" (1960)

References

External links
 

1926 births
Possibly living people
Russian male sport shooters
Trap and double trap shooters
Shooters at the 1960 Summer Olympics
Shooters at the 1964 Summer Olympics
Olympic shooters of the Soviet Union
Olympic bronze medalists for the Soviet Union
Olympic medalists in shooting
Medalists at the 1960 Summer Olympics
Sportspeople from Yaroslavl